Enriquebeltrania crenatifolia is a plant species of the family Euphorbiaceae endemic to the Yucatán Peninsula in southeastern Mexico (States of Campeche, Quintana Roo, and Yucatán).

References

Adelieae
Flora of the Yucatán Peninsula
Plants described in 1957